The 1969 Myers Brothers 250 was a NASCAR Grand National Series event that was held on August 22, 1969, at Bowman Gray Stadium in Winston-Salem, North Carolina.

Background
Bowman Gray Stadium is a NASCAR sanctioned  asphalt flat oval short track and longstanding football stadium located in Winston-Salem, North Carolina. It is one of stock car racing's most legendary venues, and is referred to as "NASCAR's longest-running weekly race track". Bowman Gray Stadium is part of the Winston-Salem Sports and Entertainment Complex and is home of the Winston-Salem State University Rams football team. It was also the home of the Wake Forest University football team from 1956 until Groves Stadium (later BB&T Field) opened in 1968.

Bowman Gray Stadium would become a popular venue for high school football in the 1970s and 1980s.

Race report
This race was the site of Richard Petty's 100th career victory in the NASCAR Cup Series driving the 1969 model year #43 Ford sponsored by Petty Enterprises. Achieving this prestigious race victory allowed Richard Petty to join the very elite group of auto racers who won 100 races in their chosen high-level motorsport. This milestone is something that Michael Schumacher failed to achieve in Formula One and for Lewis Hamilton to accomplish in the 21st century along with Sebastian Vettel.

The race took one hour and nineteen seconds for Richard Petty to defeat Bobby Isaac by four seconds in front a live audience of 10,500 people. The race was decided when Petty ran out of gas heading toward the pits and Isaac ran out of gas just after he passed by the pits. The time Isaac lost coasting all the way around was the difference between winning and losing. Three cautions were given for seventeen laps. Out of the twenty-four cars, eleven had to drop out of the race before it finished.

Total winnings for this race were $6,975 in American dollars ($ when adjusted for inflation). All twenty-four drivers were born in the United States of America.

Notable crew chiefs at the race were Harry Hyde, Dale Inman, Dick Hutcherson, and John Hill.

The transition to purpose-built racecars began in the early 1960s and occurred gradually over that decade.  Changes made to the sport by the late 1960s brought an end to the "strictly stock" vehicles of the 1950s.

Qualifying

Finishing order
Section reference: 

 Richard Petty (No. 43)
 Bobby Isaac† (No. 71)
 David Pearson† (No. 17)
 Elmo Langley† (No. 64)
 James Hylton (No. 48)
 John Sears† (No. 4)
 Neil Castles (No. 06)
 J. D. McDuffie† (No. 70)
 Wendell Scott† (No. 34)
 E.J. Trivette (No. 08)
 Ken Meisenhelder (No. 04)
 Ben Arnold (No. 76)
 Bill Champion*† (No. 10)
 Henley Gray* (No. 19)
 Peter Hazelwood* (No. 12)
 Ed Negre* (No. 8)
 Bill Seifert* (No. 45)
 James Cox* (No. 23) 
 Wayne Smith* (No. 33)
 Cecil Gordon*† (No. 47)
 Earl Brooks* (No. 26)
 Wayne Gillette* (No. 09)
 Hoss Ellington*† (No. 61)

* Driver failed to finish race 
† signifies that the driver is known to be deceased

Timeline
Section reference: 
 Start of race: Bobby Isaac started the race with the pole position.
 Lap 2: Hoss Ellington quit the race for reasons unknown.
 Lap 4: Wayne Gillette quit the race for reasons unknown.
 Lap 16: Earl Brooks quit the race for reasons unknown.
 Lap 24: Cecil Gordon quit the race for reasons unknown.
 Lap 25: Wayne Smith accidentally blew his engine, forcing him to exit the race early.
 Lap 26: An oil leak forced James Cox to abandon the race, finishing in 19th place.
 Lap 29: Bill Seifert quit the race for reasons unknown.
 Lap 82: Ed Negre had to withdraw from the race due to transmission issues.
 Lap 91: Pete Hazelwood quit the race for reasons unknown.
 Lap 93: Henley Grey noticed that his brakes stopped working on his racing vehicle.
 Lap 153: The brakes on Bill Champion's vehicle stopped working.
 Lap 242: Richard Petty took over the leader from Bobby Isaac.
 Finish: Richard Petty was officially declared the winner of the event.

References

Myers Brothers 250
Myers Brothers 250
NASCAR races at Bowman Gray Stadium